IECC may refer to:

 Illinois Eastern Community Colleges
 Integrated Electronic Control Centre, British railway signalling control system
 International Energy Conservation Code
 International E-mail Chess Club
 Internet Explorer Conditional Comment